"Hear My Name" was the first single from Armand Van Helden's mix album, New York: A Mix Odessey, and his fifth album, Nympho. The track features vocals by duo Spalding Rockwell. It was also made into a music video featuring the female duo Spalding Rockwell spanking various men and women.

Track listing
Australian CD Single
 Hear My Name (Radio Edit)
 Hear My Name (Original 12' Mix)
 Hear My Name (Solid Groove Hear My Rub Mix)
 Hear My Name (Solid Groove Hear My Dub Mix)

Chart performance
The single was a worldwide Dance and Club hit, and a minor success in Single charts.

Release history

References

2004 singles
Armand Van Helden songs
Songs written by Armand Van Helden
2004 songs